The German Tanztheater ("dance theatre") grew out of German Expressionist dance in Weimar Germany and 1920s Vienna. The term first appears around 1927 to identify a particular style of dance emerging from within the new forms of 'expressionist dance' developing in Central Europe since 1917.  Its main exponents include Mary Wigman, Kurt Jooss and Rudolf Laban. The term reappears in critical reviews in the 1980s to identify the work of primarily German choreographers who were students of Jooss (such as Pina Bausch and Reinhild Hoffmann) and Wigman (Susanne Linke), along with the Austrian Johann Kresnik. The development of the form and its concepts was influenced by Bertolt Brecht and Max Reinhardt, and the cultural ferment of the Weimar Republic.

Tanztheater is more than a mere ‘blend’ of dance and dramatic elements. Both Birringer (1986) and Schlicher (1987) argue that the particular artistic and historical context of post-war Germany informed the genesis of Tanztheater.

Tanztheater Wuppertal Pina Bausch became internationally known. Bausch's dramaturge, Raimund Hoghe, created independent productions from 1989.

Further reading

 
 
Klein, Gabriele 2020. Pina Bausch's Dance Theater: Company, Artistic Practices and Reception. transcript: Bielefeld, .
 Markard, Anna 1985. Jooss. Cologne: Ballet Bühnen Verlag.
 Preston-Dunlop Valerie & Sánchez-Colberg, Ana 2002. Dance and the Performative. London:  Verve.
 Ana Sanchez-Colberg (1992)  Traditions and Contradictions:  A Choreological Documentation of Tanztheater from its Roots in Ausdruckstanz to Present.  London: Laban Centre.
 Sánchez-Colberg, Ana 1992. You can see it like this or like that. In Jordan, S and Allen, D.(eds) 	Parallel Lines. London: Arts Council.
 Sánchez-Colberg, Ana 1993. You put your left foot in…then you shake it all about… Excursions and Incursions into Feminism and Bausch’s Tanztheater. In Thomas, Helen (ed.).  Dance, Culture and Gender London:  Routledge, 151–163.
 Sánchez-Colberg, Ana 1996. Altered States And Subliminal Places: Charting The Road Towards A Physical Theatre.
 Schlicher, Susanne 1987.  Tanztheater Traditionen und Freiheiten.  Hamburg: Reinbeck Verlag.

Expressionist theatre
Musical theatre